Eurhythma cataxia is a moth in the family Crambidae. It was described by Turner in 1913. It is found in Australia, where it has been recorded from the Northern Territory.

The wingspan is 9–10 mm. The forewings are snow-white with pale ochreous-fuscous fasciae. The hindwings are pale-grey.

References

Crambinae
Moths described in 1913